The World Ports Classic was a European two-day cycle race held between the port cities of Rotterdam and Antwerp, organized by ASO as a 2.1 event on the UCI Europe Tour. The race was held between 2012 and 2015.

In all years except for 2013, the riders started in Rotterdam, finishing the first day in Antwerp before riding in the opposite direction on the second and final day. A leader's jersey was awarded to the winner of the first stage, to be defended on the second stage.

History
The inaugural event commenced on 31 August 2012 with the first stage being won by Tom Boonen ahead of André Greipel and Alexander Kristoff. The second stage was won by Theo Bos ahead of Greipel and Boonen. Boonen won the overall classification and the points classification with Kristoff winning the youth classification.

The 2013 event, the only edition that started with the Antwerp–Rotterdam stage first, was won by Nikolas Maes of Belgium, while Bos won in 2014.

The final edition in 2015 was won by Kris Boeckmans of Belgium; Andrea Guardini won the first stage ahead of Yauheni Hutarovich and Boeckmans, while Boeckmans won the second stage ahead of Danilo Napolitano and Alessandro Bazzana.

Winners

References

External links

 
Cycle races in Belgium
Cycle races in the Netherlands
UCI Europe Tour races
Recurring sporting events established in 2012
Recurring sporting events disestablished in 2015
2012 establishments in Belgium
2012 establishments in the Netherlands
2015 disestablishments in Belgium
2015 disestablishments in the Netherlands
Sports competitions in Rotterdam
Sports competitions in Antwerp
Defunct cycling races in Belgium
Defunct cycling races in the Netherlands